Lukáš Csáno (born 11 July 2001) is a Slovak professional footballer who currently plays for FK Rača as a centre-forward.

Club career

FC Slovan Liberec
Csáno made his professional Czech First League debut for FC Slovan Liberec against FK Pardubice on 27 September 2020.

References

External links
 
 Futbalnet profile
 FC Slovan Liberec profile
 FC Spartak Trnava profile

2001 births
Living people
Slovak footballers
Association football forwards
Partizán Bardejov players
FK Rača players
2. Liga (Slovakia) players
FC Slovan Liberec players
Czech First League players
Expatriate footballers in the Czech Republic